Monel Tiberiu Cârstoiu (born 10 April 1989) is a Romanian footballer who plays as a midfielder for CSM Deva. He made his debut in Liga I on 26 July 2008, the opening day of the 2008–09 season, in a 1–1 draw at home to FC Timișoara.

Honours
Gilortul Târgu Cărbunești
 Liga IV – Gorj County: 2018–19

References

External links
 
 

1988 births
Living people
Sportspeople from Pitești
Romanian footballers
Association football midfielders
Liga I players
Liga II players
FC Argeș Pitești players
SCM Râmnicu Vâlcea players
FCV Farul Constanța players
CS Național Sebiș players
CS Știința Miroslava players